Simo Nikolić may refer to:

 Simo Nikolić (footballer) (born 1954), Yugoslav former footballer
 Simo Nikolić (sailor) (1941–2012), Croatian sailor

See also
 Sima Nikolić